The St. Francis River Bridge carries United States Route 70 over the St. Francis River near Madison in St. Francis County, Arkansas, United States. The swing span is mounted on a central pier, and is rotated by two workers operating a large hickory handle. The bridge was built in 1932–33, with the swing span design made to accommodate the demands of the United States War Department that the river remain navigable by military vessels. The bridge is one of three swing-span bridges in the state. It is likely that the swinging mechanism has never been used.

The bridge was listed on the National Register of Historic Places in 1990.

See also
List of bridges documented by the Historic American Engineering Record in Arkansas
List of bridges on the National Register of Historic Places in Arkansas
National Register of Historic Places listings in St. Francis County, Arkansas

References

External links

Historic American Engineering Record in Arkansas
Road bridges on the National Register of Historic Places in Arkansas
Bridges completed in 1933
Transportation in St. Francis County, Arkansas
Drawbridges on the National Register of Historic Places
Swing bridges in the United States
National Register of Historic Places in St. Francis County, Arkansas
Parker truss bridges in the United States
1933 establishments in Arkansas
U.S. Route 70
Bridges of the United States Numbered Highway System